The 1996 United States Senate election in Delaware was held on November 5, 1996. Incumbent Democratic U.S. Senator Joe Biden won re-election to a fifth term. This was the first Senate election in his career in which Biden's margin of victory decreased from the prior election.

Republican primary

Candidates
 Raymond Clatworthy, businessman, Christian radio station owner
 Vance Phillips, farmer
 Wilfred J. Plomis, oil and gas consultant, former apartment complex manager

Results

Campaign 
In February 1996, Biden would end up selling his home to John Cochran; a senior executive for MBNA. A pollster from Clatsworthy's campaign would suggest in a phone survey that Cochran had paid twice the value of the house. In reality, Cochran had paid the $1.2 million it was on the market for. "officials" from MBNA dismissed what the pollster had to say and Biden would end up making a document from 1992 from the Delaware Appraisal Group public that said the home's value was $1.2 million. The controversy would continue to be pushed when a conservative magazine named The American Spectator publishing an article in 1998 calling Biden "The Senator from MBNA".

Libertarian Party NEWS would report that Mark Jones who was Libertarian Party's candidate would be the first candidate from the party in the state to campaign full time as he resigned his position as an assistant professor at Goldey–Beacom College.

Debates

First 
The first senatorial debate would be held on September 29, 1996 in Wilmington and was hosted by WHYY-TV. The candidates that participated in the debate were: Joe Biden, Raymond Clatworthy and Mark Jones.

The debate would begin by candidates being given an introductory statement for two minutes. Biden would say his first followed by Jones and Clatworthy would last.

After the opening statements there would be discussion on social security with Biden and Clatworthy primarily participating although Jones did interject occasionally. After discussion about social security ended, one of the moderators would ask the candidates which of the Founding Fathers they liked the best. Jones responded first saying Thomas Jefferson while Clatworthy said George Washington. Biden answered differently saying that Abraham Lincoln was his favorite president and listed the accomplishments of presidents he thought were noble along with their achievements. He was reminded by a moderator who reminded him he was talking about the founding fathers. He would say that Thomas Jefferson was the most significant but didn't mention it as his favorite.

For the rest of the debate topics such as: Clatworthy's ties with the Christian Coalition, abortion, crime, terrorism and foreign policy were talked about. A moderator would ask a final question to the candidates about how they see themselves as being different from each other.

Second 
The second senatorial debate would occur on October 29, 1996 in New Castle. The four candidates who would participate in the debate were: Joe Biden, Raymond J. Clatworthy, Mark Jones and Jacqueline Kossoff.

General election

Candidates
 Joe Biden, incumbent Delaware Senator running for a fifth consecutive term
 Raymond Clatworthy, businessman
Mark Jones, assistant professor of computer science at Goldey–Beacom College and former faculty member of the University of Delaware.
Jacqueline Kossoff

Results

See also 
 1996 United States Senate elections

External links 

 Video footage of the 1996 Senatorial debate from C-SPAN

References 

1996
Delaware
1996 Delaware elections
s